Aamer Sohail (born 10 October 1972) is a former Pakistani first-class cricketer who played for Bahawalpur and Pakistan Customs. He played 62 First-class and 40 List A cricket games

References

External links
 

1972 births
Living people
Pakistani cricketers
Cricketers from Bahawalpur